Snijman is a surname. Notable people with the surname include:

Dierdré A. Snijman (born 1949), South African botanist
Esaias Reynier Snijman (1822–1884), South African politician